The City of Valencia International Band Contest is a music contest for wind orchestras and concert bands.

References

Music competitions in Spain